Semyon Nikolaevich Korsakov (14 January 1787 – 1 December 1853 OS) was a Russian government official, noted both as a homeopath and an inventor who was involved with an early version of information technology.

Biography
Korsakov was born in 1787 in what is now Kherson, Ukraine (then part of the Russian empire).  His father was a military engineer.  The family had migrated from Lithuania in the 14th century.

He was married to Sofia Mordvinova and they had four daughters and six sons, one of whom, Mikhail Semyonovich (1826–1871), became famous in his own right as governor-general of Eastern Siberia and was the namesake of the town of Korsakov in Sakhalin Oblast and several Russian geological features.

From 1812 to 1814, Semyon Korsakov took part in the Napoleonic Wars with the Russian Army.  He later was to serve as an official in the statistics department of the Russian Police Ministry in St. Petersburg.  He was a recipient of the Order of St. Anna and the Order of St. Vladimir.

Korsakov died in 1853 in the village of Tarusovo, then part of the Moscow Province.

Homeopathy
Though Korsakov was not formally trained as a doctor, he was interested in medicine, possibly because of the difficulty in getting medical care in the rural area where he lived.  According to his journals he treated several thousand patients, at first using conventional medicine, but in 1829 switching to homeopathy at the urging of his relatives.

Korsakov is noted in homeopathic circles as the originator of the Korsakovian method of dilution, which differed from the Hahnemannian dilutions used by (and named for) homeopathy's founder in that it used a single container for a series of dilutions rather than a new container for each.  Korsakov also used dilutions higher than those previously used (30C and higher).  Dilutions made using his method are commonly designated with the letter "K", e.g. 15K.

Inventions

While working in the statistics department of the Police Ministry, Korsakov became intrigued with the possibility of using machinery to "enhance natural intelligence".  To this end, he devised several devices which he called "machines for the comparison of ideas".  These included the "linear homeoscope with movable parts", the "linear homeoscope without movable parts", the "flat homeoscope", the "ideoscope", and the "simple comparator".  The purpose of the devices was primarily to facilitate the search for information, stored in the form of punched cards or similar media (for example, wooden boards with perforations).  Korsakov announced his new method in September 1832, and rather than seeking patents offered the machines for public use.

The punch card had been introduced in 1805, but until that time had been used solely in the  textile industry to control looms.  Korsakov was reputedly the first to use the cards for information storage.

Korsakov presented his ideas to the Imperial Academy of Sciences in St. Petersburg, but their experts rejected his application, failing to see the potential of mechanizing searches through large stores of information.  His machines were largely forgotten until after the Second World War, when a revival of historical interest resulted in the publication (in 1961) of several documents from the academy's archives relating to Korsakov's machines and the uncovering of a book about them written by Korsakov himself.

Notes

References
Povarov G.N. Semen Nikolayevich Korsakov. Machines for the Comparison of Philosophical Ideas. In: Trogemann, Georg; Ernst, Wolfgang and Nitussov, Alexander, Computing in Russia: The History of Computer Devices and Information Technology Revealed (pp 47–49), Verlag, 2001. Translated by Alexander Y. Nitussov. , 
Semen Korsakov's inventions, Cybernetics Dept. of MEPhI 
Semen Korsakov’s brochure of 1832 (translated from the French). Ed. by Alexander Mikhailov , 2009
С.Н. Корсаков, World of Homeopathy (Мир Гомеопатии) 

1787 births
1853 deaths
Russian homeopaths
Russian inventors
Russian statisticians
Russian military personnel of the Napoleonic Wars
People from Kherson
Recipients of the Order of St. Anna
Recipients of the Order of St. Vladimir
Russian computer scientists